Mark Reddish (born 3 March 1985) is a former New Zealand rugby union player who played as a lock for Wellington in the Mitre 10 Cup and the Highlanders in Super Rugby. Reddish moved to England to play for Harlequins in 2016 and retired from playing a year later due to medical advice.

References

External links
Hurricanes profile
Wellington profile
itsrugby.co.uk profile

1985 births
Living people
New Zealand rugby union players
Hurricanes (rugby union) players
Wellington rugby union players
Highlanders (rugby union) players
Rugby union locks
Rugby union players from Wellington City
People educated at Rongotai College
Harlequin F.C. players
New Zealand expatriate rugby union players
Expatriate rugby union players in England
New Zealand expatriate sportspeople in England